Banjara needle crafts are traditional handmade fabrics made by Banjaras in India. They are made in tribals Lambada habitation known as Thanda.

References

External links
 Rich tapestry of embroidery

Indian handicrafts
Tribal art